Lupghar Sar is 108th on the list of world tallest mountains. It is located in Shimshal valley of Hunza Gojal. In  Wakhi language Lupghar Sar translates as "the top of the big rock".

Climbing History
First Ascent: In 1979, the German brothers Hans and Sepp Gloggner reached the summit of Lupghar Sar West.
First Solo Ascent: On 7 July 2018, Austrian alpinist Hansjörg Auer reached the summit of Lupghar Sar West following a line on the left side of the West Face to reach the steep North West Ridge in a solo alpine style climb, for which he won the 2019 Piolet d'Or.

See also
 List of mountains in Pakistan

References

Seven-thousanders of the Karakoram
Mountains of Gilgit-Baltistan